Season two of the 2015 edition of El Gran Show premiered on August 8, 2015.

In this season the format of professional dancers returned instead of dreamers. In addition, this was the first season to cancel a live show, as there was a fire on the set, forcing production to cancel the broadcast.

On October 31, 2015, actor Ismael La Rosa and Michelle Vallejos were declared the winners, actor and singer Erick Elera and Andrea Huapaya finished second, while singer Milena Zárate and Anselmo Pedraza finished third.

Cast

Couples 
The 12 celebrities were presented on August 1, 2015, during the finals of last season, while the professional dancers were presented during the first week.

During the show, two celebrities left the competition. The first was the actress Alessandra Denegri, who withdraw due to an injury, so she was replaced by reality TV star, Chris Soifer. The second was the cumbia singer Marisol Ramírez, who withdraw the competition due to an injury, being replaced by the eliminated celebrity, Xoana González, being the first time that a previously eliminated celebrity takes the place of another.

Hosts and judges 
Gisela Valcárcel, Aldo Díaz, Paco Bazán returned as hosts, while Morella Petrozzi, Carlos Cacho, Pachi Valle Riestra and the VIP Jury returned as judges. Bazán withdrew from the show due to personal issues, being replaced by Jaime "Choca" Mandros (former contestant of the season 1 of 2013).

Scoring charts 

Red numbers indicate the sentenced for each week
Green numbers indicate the best steps for each week
 the couple was eliminated that week
 the couple was safe in the duel
 the couple was eliminated that week and safe with a lifeguard
 the winning couple
 the runner-up couple
 the third-place couple

Average score chart 
This table only counts dances scored on a 40-point scale.

Highest and lowest scoring performances 
The best and worst performances in each dance according to the judges' 40-point scale are as follows:

Couples' highest and lowest scoring dances 
Scores are based upon a potential 40-point maximum.

Weekly scores 
Individual judges' scores in the charts below (given in parentheses) are listed in this order from left to right: Morella Petrozzi, Carlos Cacho, Pachi Valle Riestra, VIP Jury.

Week 1: First Dances 
The couples danced cumbia or pachanga.
Running order

Week 2: The Dance That I Do Not Master 
The couples (except those sentenced) performed one unlearned dance which each celebrity chose as the most complicated to perform.

Due to work issues, Marisol Ramírez was unable to perform, so singer Vernis Hernández replaced her.
Running order

Week 3: Characterization Night 
The couples (except those sentenced) performed one unlearned dance being characterized to popular music icons.
Running order

Week 4: The 90's Night 
The couples (except those sentenced) performed one unlearned dance to famous '90s songs.
Running order

Week 5: Salsa Night 
The couples (except those sentenced) danced salsa.
Running order

Week 6: World Dances Night 
The couples (except those sentenced) performed the world dances.

Due to a fire produced during the performance of Coto & Laura, the production decided to cancel the live show. For this reason, the rest of the couples did not danced. It was decided that the elimination between the sentenced couples will be determined next week and that all couples would perform new dances.
Running order

Week 7: Double Dance Night 
The couples (except those sentenced) performed a double dance. In the versus, only two couples faced dancing jazz, the winner would take two extra points plus the couples who gave their support votes.
Running order

Week 8: Trio Cha-cha-cha Night 
The couples (except those sentenced) danced a trio cha-cha-cha involving another celebrity.
Running order

Week 9: Latin Pop Night 
The couples (except those sentenced) danced latin pop. In the little train, the participants faced dancing jazz.

Due to an injury, Alessandra Denegri could not dance with Raúl Romero, so Chris Soifer enters her place from this week.
Running order

Week 10: Jive Night 
The couples (except those sentenced) danced jive. In the versus, the couples faced dancing guaracha, while in the little train, the participants faced dancing jazz.

Due to an injury, Marisol Ramírez could not dance with Jorge Valcárcel, so Xoana González enters her place from this week.
Running order

Week 11: Quarterfinals 
The couples (except those sentenced) performed a trio salsa involving another celebrity and a team dance, in which only celebrities participated.
Running order

Week 12: Semifinals 
The couples (except those sentenced) performed a trio double dance involving another celebrity. In the versus, only the sentenced couples faced dancing mambo.
Running order

Week 13: Finals 
On the first part, only the sentenced couples danced cumbia.

On the second part, the final three couples danced freestyle and quickstep.
Running order (Part 1)

Running order (Part 2)

Dance chart
The celebrities and professional partners will dance one of these routines for each corresponding week:
 Week 1: Cumbia or pachanga (First Dances)
 Week 2: One unlearned dance (The Dance That I Do Not Master)
 Week 3: One unlearned dance (Characterization Night)
 Week 4: One unlearned dance (The 90's Night)
 Week 5: Salsa (Salsa Night)
 Week 6: One unlearned dance (World Dances Night)
 Week 7: Double dance & the versus (Double Dance Night)
 Week 8: Trio cha-cha-cha (Trio Cha-cha-cha Night)
 Week 9: Latin pop & the little train (Latin Pop Night)
 Week 10: Jive, the versus & the little train (Jive Night)
 Week 11: Salsa & team dances (Quarterfinals)
 Week 12: Trio double dance & the versus (Semifinals)
 Week 13: Cumbia, freestyle & quickstep (Finals)

 Highest scoring dance
 Lowest scoring dance
 Not scored or danced by the celebrity
 Gained bonus points for winning this dance
 Gained no bonus points for losing this dance
 Danced, but not scored
In Italic indicate the dances performed in the duel

Notes

References

External links 

El Gran Show
2015 Peruvian television seasons
Reality television articles with incorrect naming style